Fiji competed at the 1996 Summer Olympics in Atlanta, United States.

Results by event

Athletics
Men's 4 × 400 m Relay
 Soloveni Nakaunicina, Henry Semiti, Solomone Bole, and Isireli Naikelekelevesi
 Heat — 3:10.67 (→ did not advance)

Judo
 Nacanieli Qerewaqa - ?

Weightlifting
Men's Light-Heavyweight
Rupeni Varea
 Final — 115.0 + 150.0 = 265.0 (→ 17th place)

See also
 Fiji at the 1996 Summer Paralympics

References
Official Olympic Reports

Nations at the 1996 Summer Olympics
1996
1996 in Fijian sport